Katarína Listopadová (born March 22, 1993, in Bratislava) is a Slovak swimmer, who specialized in freestyle, butterfly, and individual medley events. She currently holds four Slovak records in the freestyle relays (both 400 and 800 m). Listopadova is also a resident athlete for J&T Sport Team Bratislava, and is coached and trained by Gabriel Baran.

Listopadova made her international debut at the 2010 Summer Youth Olympics in Singapore, where she placed fourth in the 100 m freestyle (56.90), 50 m butterfly (27.38), and 100 m butterfly (1:00.35).

At the 2012 Summer Olympics in London, Listopadova qualified as Slovakia's youngest athlete and swimmer for the women's 200 m individual medley. She posted a FINA B-standard entry time of 2:16.42 from the Budapest Open in Hungary. She topped the first heat by more than half a second (0.50) ahead of Olympic veterans Cheng Wan-jung of Chinese Taipei and Emilia Pikkarainen of Finland, outside her entry time of 2:16.81. Listopadova failed to advance into the semifinals, as she shared a twenty-eighth place tie with Iceland's Eygló Ósk Gústafsdóttir in the preliminaries.

References

External links
 
NBC Olympics Profile

1993 births
Living people
Slovak female swimmers
Olympic swimmers of Slovakia
Swimmers at the 2012 Summer Olympics
Swimmers at the 2016 Summer Olympics
Swimmers at the 2010 Summer Youth Olympics
Universiade medalists in swimming
Sportspeople from Bratislava
Universiade bronze medalists for Slovakia
Female butterfly swimmers
Slovak female freestyle swimmers
Medalists at the 2015 Summer Universiade
20th-century Slovak women
21st-century Slovak women